Thiratoscirtus fuscorufescens is a jumping spider species in the genus Thiratoscirtus. It was described by Embrik Strand in 1906. The species can be found in Cameroon.

References

Further reading

Endemic fauna of Cameroon
Salticidae
Spiders of Africa
Arthropods of Cameroon
Spiders described in 1906
Taxa named by Embrik Strand